Nancy G. Leveson is an American specialist in system and software safety and a Professor of Aeronautics and Astronautics at MIT, United States.

Leveson gained her degrees (in computer science, mathematics and management) from UCLA, including her PhD in 1980. Previously she worked at University of California, Irvine and the University of Washington as a faculty member. She has studied safety-critical systems such as the Traffic Collision Avoidance System (TCAS) for the avoidance of midair collisions between aircraft and problems with the Therac-25 radiation therapy machine.

Leveson has been editor of the journal IEEE Transactions on Software Engineering. She has held memberships in the ACM, IEEE Computer Society, System Safety Society, and AIAA.

Biography 
Leveson is Professor of Aeronautics and Astronautics and also Professor of Engineering Systems at MIT. Prof. Leveson conducts research on the topics of system safety, software safety, software and system engineering, and human-computer interaction.

In 1999, she received the ACM Allen Newell Award for outstanding computer science research and in 1995 the AIAA Information Systems Award for "developing the field of software safety and for promoting responsible software and system engineering practices where life and property are at stake." She was elected a member of the National Academy of Engineering (NAE) in 2000 for contributions to software safety.

She has published over 200 research papers and is author of two books, "Safeware: System Safety and Computers" published in 1995 by Addison-Wesley and "Engineering a Safer World" published in 2012 by MIT Press. She consults extensively in many industries on the ways to prevent accidents. In 2005, she received the ACM Sigsoft Outstanding Research Award.

She developed the STPA (System Theoretic Process Analysis) and STAMP (System Theoretic Accident Model and Processes) methodologies for accident analysis.

In 2020, she received the IEEE Medal for Environmental and Safety Technologies for her development of STAMP and other system safety and accident modeling analysis tools.

Books 
 Erik Hollnagel, David D. Woods, Nancy Leveson, Resilience Engineering: Concepts and Precepts. Ashgate Publishing, Ltd., 2007. .
 Nancy G. Leveson, Safeware: System Safety and Computers. Addison-Wesley, 1995. .
 Nancy G. Leveson, Engineering a Safer World: Systems Thinking Applied to Safety. MIT Press, 2011. .  Open access pdf downloads of book chapters.

References

External links 
 Nancy Leveson's Home Page at MIT
 
 Medical Devices - Therac 25

Living people
American non-fiction writers
Formal methods people
University of California, Los Angeles alumni
University of California, Irvine faculty
University of Washington faculty
MIT School of Engineering faculty
Computer science writers
Academic journal editors
Year of birth missing (living people)
American women computer scientists
American computer scientists
Members of the United States National Academy of Engineering
American women academics
21st-century American women